Constanza María Palma Parra (born 29 March 1992) is a field hockey player from Chile, who plays as a midfielder.

Personal life
Constanza Palma was born and raised in Santiago, Chile.

Career

Hockey
Constanza Palma has represented Chile at both junior and senior levels.

Under–21
In 2009, Palma was a member of the Chile U–21 at the FIH Junior World Cup in Boston.

Three years later in 2012, she represented the team at the Pan American Junior Championship in Guadalajara.

Las Diablas
Palma made her debut for Las Diablas in 2010. Her first major tournament for the team was the same year, at the South American Championships, held in Rio de Janeiro.

Since her debut, Palma has medalled many times with the national team. This includes silver and bronze at the 2014 and the 2018 South American Games respectively, bronze at the 2018–19 FIH Series Finals, and most notably silver at the 2017 Pan American Cup.

CrossFit
In addition to hockey, Palma also competes in CrossFit. She participated in the annual CrossFit Games from 2014 to 2017.

References

External links

1992 births
Living people
Chilean female field hockey players
Female field hockey midfielders
South American Games medalists in field hockey
South American Games silver medalists for Chile
South American Games bronze medalists for Chile
Competitors at the 2014 South American Games
Competitors at the 2018 South American Games
Sportspeople from Santiago
20th-century Chilean women
21st-century Chilean women